Hoesan Gam clan is one of the Korean clans. Their Bon-gwan is in Changwon, South Gyeongsang Province. According to the research held in 2000, the number of Hoesan Gam clan’s member was in 679 households 2113 members out of 4892 total Gam members. Their founder was  who was a Hanlin Academy in Yuan dynasty. He entered Goryeo in 1349. He was there as a fatherly master when Queen Noguk had an marriage to an ordinary person planned by Gongmin of Goryeo.

See also 
 Korean clan names of foreign origin

References

External links 
 

 
Gam clans
Korean clan names of Chinese origin